Parisi is an Italian surname. Notable people with the surname include:

 Ascanio Parisi (died 1614), Roman Catholic Bishop of Marsico Nuovo and Titular Bishop of Hebron (1599–1600)
 Alessandro Parisi (born 1977), Italian footballer
 Alessandro Parisi (footballer, born 1988), Italian footballer
 Alice Parisi (born 1990), Italian footballer
 Angelo Parisi (born 1953), French judoka and olympic champion
 Arturo Parisi (born 1940), Italian politician
 Bruno Parisi (1884–1957), Italian zoologist and museum director
 Cliff Parisi (born 1960), British actor
 Franca Parisi (born 1933), Italian actress
 Francesco Parisi (economist) (born 1962), Italian-American scholar in law and economics
 Francesco Parisi (painter) (1857–1948), Italian-Argentine painter
 Francesco Parisi (politician) (1930–2016), Italian Christian Democracy politician
 Franco Parisi (born 1967), Chilean economist and politician
 Franco Parisi (soccer) (born 1983), Australian football player
 Giampaolo Parisi (born 1979), Italian footballer
 Giorgio Parisi (born 1948), Italian physicist and 2021 winner of the Nobel Prize in Physics
 Giovanni Parisi (1967–2009), Italian boxer
 Gustavo "Cucho" Parisi, member of the Argentine band Los Auténticos Decadentes
 Heather Parisi (born 1960), American-born Italian television presenter, dancer, singer and actress
 Hugo Parisi (born 1984), Brazilian diver
 Joanna Parisi, Italian-American operatic spinto soprano
 Joe Parisi (born 1960), American politician
 Joseph Parisi (disambiguation), several people
 Lautaro Parisi (born 1994), Argentine professional footballer
 Mark Parisi (born 1961), American cartoonist
 Melissa Parisi, American geneticist and physician
 Mike Parisi (born 1983), American professional baseball pitcher
 Paula Parisi (born 1967), Argentine volleyball player
 Stefano Parisi (born 1956), Italian businessman and politician
 Tino Parisi (born 1995), Italian football player
 Tony Parisi (wrestler) (born 1941), Italian-born Canadian professional wrestler
 Tony Parisi (software developer), Italian entrepreneur, researcher and developer of 3D computer software
 Vittorio Parisi (born 1957), Italian conductor and teacher

See Also 

 Johnny Swinger (born 1975), professional wrestler who performed under the name "Johnny Parisi"
 Paris (surname)
 Parisii (disambiguation)